The Weatherford Democrat is a five-day daily newspaper published in Weatherford, Texas, on Tuesday through Friday and on Saturday. Covering Parker County, Texas, it is owned by  Community Newspaper Holdings Inc.

Amid large revenue losses associated with the COVID-19 pandemic, the Mineral Wells Index, a sister CNHI newspaper located about 20 miles away, published its last issue in May 2020 and merged with the Democrat, which plans to cover both areas.

References

External links
 Weatherford Democrat Website
 CNHI Website

Weatherford Democrat
Weatherford Democrat